Hermann Zander (10 November 1912 – 24 February 1973) was a German rower. He competed in the men's eight event at the 1952 Summer Olympics.

References

1912 births
1973 deaths
German male rowers
Olympic rowers of Germany
Rowers at the 1952 Summer Olympics
Sportspeople from Bochum